Capalonga, officially the Municipality of Capalonga, is a 3rd class municipality in the province of Camarines Norte, Philippines. According to the 2020 census, it has a population of 36,223 people.

History

Agtas and Dumagats, are believed to be the first inhabitants of village used to be called "Apalong". This name was derived from a wild plant called "Palong Manok", which looks like a rooster's comb. It is said that whenever the settlers of Apalong went to other places and asked where they came from, the usual reply is "We came from Kapalungan". Historians may comment that the natives were either referring to their place which has many  "Palong" (roster's comb) or maybe they wanted identification for their settlement. Whatever it was, no record will show and no one at that time is still living, what is clearly known to Capalongueños is that this place was and still is an environment of flowers called Palong Manok.
In 1572, the Spanish Conquistador Capt Juan de Salcedo and his men reached pacific shores and landed on Kapalongan settlement. Instead of finding gold, they found abundant wild beautiful red flowers that looked like roster's comb. The Spaniards built a church, formed a government, and the village was made a town and officially named Capalonga. The Spaniards for some years persisted on mining for gold at Sitio Maglagonlong, and the Spanish control was described to be brutal, harsh and full of harassment until they went away leaving behind imprints on the community's cultural heritage.

It is also believed that the first migrants of Capalonga came from the neighboring province of Tayabas. This is the reason that out of the twelve (12) municipalities of Camarines Norte, Capalonga has the highest rating and accent in speaking the Tagalog language. However, with the continuous migration process, mixed dialects has been produced. Today, like other places in the country, the dialects of the residents were enriched by various local medium of expression, thereby making no difference from the trend of other political units.

Without roads and being isolated from other towns by mountains, forest, rivers and sea, Capalonga remained relatively undeveloped by commerce and industry as late as the 1950s. In 1956, the road to Capalonga was opened. Still, growth had been slow until Martial law changed the pace. It was in the years 1987 to 1992 that all wooden and temporary bridges have been replaced by concrete bridges. Likewise, in the late part of 2003 up to the present, the paving of the Bagong Silang - Capalonga Road has started and existence of the air-conditioned van transport is now available as a result.

Demographics

Geography

Barangays
Capalonga is politically subdivided into 22 barangays. In 1955, the sitio of Ilayang Basiad was converted into the barrio of San Pedro.

Climate

Economy

Tourism

Nature
Guijanlo Island - Located at Barangay Camagsaan with a beautiful sandbar and white sand Beach.
Boorey-Boorey Island - Located at Barangay San Roque with amazing Rock Formation
Itok Falls - Located 4 km. west of the town with fresh and lush foliage and vegetation.
Bangka-bangka Falls-Located at Barangay Alayao. It is being called as Bangka-bangka(Boat),because of its boat-like shape.
Albino Beach-Located at sitio Talagpucao Barangay Catioan with relaxing smooth waves and fine sand.
Mount Samat-Located at Barangay Alayao. This mountain is covered by the undiscovered species of ferns, orchids, etc.  There are also falls with fresh cold clear water.
Camagsaan Bridge- Located at Sabang bridge where it is a passage to the beauty of Tinago beach resort and Selfie Beach Resort

Festivals and Cultural Entertainments
 Feast of the Black Nazarene (May 13) - The town Fiesta in honor of the Black Nazarene draws devotees from all over the country. The image is said to be miraculous and its feast is particularly celebrated by Chinese businessmen, who pay annual homage and ask for long life and good fortune.
 Palong Festival (May 10–13) - Highlighted by colorful streetdancing and agro-industrial fair which expresses the local folks’ gratitude for their town's name's etymology, and signifies the abundant presence of "Palong Manok" (rooster's comb plant) available in the locality. Held also in celebration of the Black Nazarene's Feast Day on May 13 at the town of Capalonga.

References

 Municipal Planning and Development Office LGU, Capalonga, Camarines Norte

External links
 [ Philippine Standard Geographic Code]
Philippine Census Information

Municipalities of Camarines Norte